Qareh Naz or Qarah Naz or Qarehnaz may refer to:
 Qarah Naz, alternate name of Tazeh Kand-e Qarah Naz, East Azerbaijan Province
 Qareh Naz-e Olya, East Azerbaijan Province
 Qareh Naz-e Sofla, East Azerbaijan Province
 Qarah Naz, Zanjan
 Qareh Naz Rural District, in East Azerbaijan Province